USS LCI(L)222 was a United States Navy ship classified as a Landing Craft Infantry Large. She was assigned to the Asiatic-Pacific Theater during World War II.

LCI-222 was laid down on 17 October 1942, at George Lawley & Sons Corp., Neponset, Massachusetts and launched on 29 November 1942.  She received her commission on 3 December 1942.

During World War II USS LCI(L)-222 was assigned to the Asiatic-Pacific Theater and participated in the New Georgia Group operations, the New Georgia-Rendova-Vangunu occupation from 1 to 4 July 1943, the Vella Level occupation on 15 August 1943,	the Treasury Island-Bougainville operation and the Treasury Island landing, on 27 October 1943, and the occupation and defense of Cape Torokina, on 3 and 4 December 1943. USS LCI(L)-222 was at Eniwetok Atoll, Marshall Islands on 8 December 1945 en route from Tiapan to Pearl Harbor.

Her decommissioning date is unknown.  She was struck from the Naval Register in 1946 and was sold on 7 November 1946 with her final disposition and fate unknown.

USS LCI(L)-222 earned two battle stars for World War II service

References
logbooks of LCI(L)-222
Dale Kirkham's history and movements of the ship
http://www.navsource.org/archives/10/15/150222.htm

1942 ships
Landing ships of the United States Navy
World War II amphibious warfare vessels of the United States
Ships built in Boston